Karol Andrzej Domagalski (born 8 September 1989) is a Polish former racing cyclist, who rode professionally between 2012 and 2021 for the , , , and  teams. With , Domagalski competed at the 2014 Vuelta a España and 2014 Giro di Lombardia.

Major results

2010
 7th Overall Vuelta Ciclista a León
 8th Overall Cinturó de l'Empordà
2011
 3rd Road race, National Under-23 Road Championships
2013
 6th Overall Tour of Małopolska
2015
 5th Beaumont Trophy
2016
 Tour de Korea
1st Stages 3 & 5
 2nd Overall Ronde van Midden-Nederland
1st Stage 1 (TTT)
 4th Time trial, National Road Championships
 6th Velothon Wales
 7th Prueba Villafranca de Ordizia
 9th Klasika Primavera
2017
 1st Grand Prix des Marbriers
 1st Stage 1 (TTT) Ronde van Midden-Nederland
 2nd Velothon Wales
 3rd Overall Szlakiem Walk Majora Hubala
 5th Time trial, National Road Championships
2018
 2nd Rutland–Melton CiCLE Classic
 5th Overall Circuit des Ardennes
 5th Overall Tour of Małopolska
2019
 7th Overall Szlakiem Walk Majora Hubala

References

External links

1989 births
Living people
Polish male cyclists
People from Skała
Sportspeople from Lesser Poland Voivodeship